
Milluni (Aymara millu light brown, reddish, fair-haired, dark chestnut, -ni suffix to indicate ownership, "the one that has got a brown colour") is a lake on the western side of the Cordillera Real of Bolivia located in the La Paz Department, Pedro Domingo Murillo Province, El Alto Municipality, north of El Alto.

The lake is situated at a height of 4,565 metres (14,977 ft) south of the mountain Wayna Potosí, at the foot of Chacaltaya. It is about 1.83 km long and 1 km at its widest point. The surface is 2.37 km² (0.92 sq mi). At the south side there is a dam.

Milluni Lake is also called Milluni Grande (Spanish for big) in order to distinguish it from a smaller, half moon shaped lake next to it in the north, Milluni Chico (Spanish for small), which is situated at a height of 4,585 m.

Gallery

See also 
 Laram Quta
 Milluni Peak
 Phaq'u Quta
 Zongo River

References

External links 

 El Alto Municipality: population data and map showing Milluni Lake

Lakes of La Paz Department (Bolivia)
Dams in Bolivia